Tuomo Prättälä also known by the mononym Tuomo (born 30 April 1979 Helsinki) is a Finnish soul singer, musician, and composer. He sings and plays the piano and keyboards. He has been involved in a number of musical groups, including Quintessence, Q-Continuum, the Ilmiliekki Quartet, Huba, the Emma Salokoski Ensemble, and MP4, and has released a number of solo albums. In 2007, Prättälä won the Suomen Jazzliitto (Finnish Jazz Federation) for best Finnish jazz artist.

Discography

Albums
(All albums credited as Tuomo)

References

Finnish jazz musicians
1979 births
Living people
Musicians from Helsinki
Finnish soul singers
21st-century Finnish singers